Protoboarmia porcelaria, the porcelain gray or dash-lined looper, is a Geometrid species of moth found throughout North America, except in the far north. The species was first described by Achille Guenée in 1857.

Description

Adult
Adults have a wingspan of 27–30 mm. The wings are brown gray and have crossed brown/gray curved lines. At least one of these lines has a small tooth-like dentation along the length. There is a blotch of black at the postmedian start and a discal spot where the antemedian line crosses the costa. The hindwing discal mark is usually in the center.

Immature
Mature caterpillars are 25 mm in length and have a distinct Y-pattern on segments one through six. There is only one generation a year in the northern range while there are two in its southern range. The head is gray with a cream colored herringbone pattern on the lobes. The body is slim and is mottled gray and white with a white dorsum.

Life cycle

Adult
The female lays around 150 eggs on the foliage of host plants in July. Adults are seen from May to September.

Immature
The larvae overwinter in their penultimate instar stage. The larvae awaken and begin feeding in early spring and pupate in June. Immature larvae are phyllophagous and mainly feed upon balsam fir, red spruce, tamarack, white spruce but are also seen on the following.

References

Moths of North America
Boarmiini
Insect pests of temperate forests